Andrea Mason may refer to:

 Andrea Mason (actress) (born 1968), British actress
 Andrea Mason (politician) (born 1968), Australian politician